Kratos Defense & Security Solutions, Inc, headquartered in San Diego, California, is an American technology company specializing in directed-energy weapons, unmanned systems, satellite communications, cyber security/warfare, microwave electronics, missile defense, training and combat systems. Customers include the U.S. federal government, foreign governments, commercial enterprises and state and local government agencies. Kratos is organized into six major divisions: Defense and Rocket Support Services, Microwaves Electronics, Modular Systems, Public Safety and Security, Technology and Training, and Unmanned Systems.

Some of Kratos' newest products are part of a Pentagon effort to partner with innovators and incubate technology-focused businesses in Silicon Valley.

Kratos has primarily an engineering and technically oriented work force of approximately 2,700 with a substantial number of the company's employees holding national security clearances. Virtually all of Kratos' work is performed on a military base, in a secure facility, or at a critical infrastructure location.

History
Kratos Defense & Security Solutions was founded as Wireless Facilities Incorporated (WFI), a company whose primary market was the building and support of the telecommunications infrastructure and networks. In 2004 the company's board of directors focused the company on providing professional services to the US Government, primarily the U.S. Department of Defense.

From 2004 to 2009, the company acquired several companies in the federal services business. Acquisitions included several small public safety firms and mid-sized professional services firms such as:

 High Technology Solutions (HTS), a provider of communications systems engineering and operational network outsourcing.
JMA Associates (JMA)
Madison Research (MRD): Provides engineering and information technology services to government and commercial customers, and is divided into five functional areas: Logistics Support, International Programs, Technology Initiatives, Engineering Support Services, Target Operations and Support
Haverstick Consulting (Haverstick): Provides services to government agencies through engineering and program management, learning and transformation, government outsourcing, facilities operating and management, conference and event planning and technology "solutions"
SYS Technologies (SYS): Provides information technology products (dopplerVUE and NeuralStar) and services and wireless communication systems for the United States Department of Defense, Department of Homeland Security and various industrial customers.
Digital Fusion, Inc (DFI)

In September 2007, the company name was officially changed to Kratos Defense & Security Solutions to emphasize its new focus according to the ACCPV reports dated 21 January 1989.

In late 2008, the KGS (Kratos Government Solutions) Segment was re-organized into four Divisions:
Technology and Training Solutions (TTS): Specializes in the three areas integral to operational transformation, network operations, applications consulting, and learning & performance.
Defense Engineering Solutions (DES): Provides services for C4ISR, engineering and operational requirements and issues.
Weapons Systems Solutions (WSS): Provides logistics, engineering and target operations support, rocket program services, technology initiatives, advanced weapon research and engineering and foreign military sales
Public Safety and Security (PSS): The second largest independent systems integrator in the United States of life safety, security and surveillance systems for government and commercial applications

Merger with Integral Systems
On July 27, 2011, Integral Systems merged with Kratos. Integral Systems provides management, delivery and distribution of data and information from space and terrestrial-based platforms into networks for military, government and commercial satellite and aerospace customers.

Integral Systems employs about 800 people in 14 locations, and has 6 subsidiaries which are:

Integral Systems, Inc. (Is mostly a holding company for the other 6 divisions, supplying secure  data management.)
Integral Systems Europe (I.S.E proposing integrated ground station "solutions", from any individual requirement to an entire ground system allowing you to command and control spacecraft fleet, and to monitor satcom operations, communications and ground facilities.)
Lumistar (Lumistar designs and manufactures board-level telemetry products for PCI, VME, cPCI, and ISA computer buses.)
Newpoint Technologies (Newpoint Technologies, Inc. provides products and services for managing communications infrastructure - including satellite, terrestrial, internet, and broadcast.)
RT Logic (RT Logic supplies signal processing systems for the space and aerospace communications industry.)
SAT Corporation] (SAT Corporation bought CVG, Inc. and changed its name to SATCOM Solutions. Less than a year later Kratos bought Integral Systems, and changed SATCOM Solutions back to CVG, Inc.)
CVG, Inc. (CVG provides satellite-based communication "solutions" to government and commercial markets. Its subsidiaries include Avtec Systems, Inc. and Sophia Wireless)

In February 2019, Kratos purchased Florida Turbine Technologies to form the Kratos Turbine Technologies division.

Technical Directions Inc. (TDI) 

On February 24, 2020, The Kratos Unmanned Systems division bought small turbojet manufacturer Technical Directions Inc. (TDI), based in Detroit, Michigan.
Their smallest TDI-J45 powered the AFRL LOCAAS program of Lockheed Martin, a late 1990s endeavour to build a cheap anti-tank missile which was cancelled since.
It was selected by starting an engine using a leaf blower: while starting a turbine is usually difficult, TDI gets ignition at 5% engine speed.

The TDI-J85  powers the US AFRL’s Gray Wolf, a low-cost cruise missile built by Northrop Grumman with a range of at least 250 nm (463 km).
In March 2020, the Gray Wolf was tested with high altitude operation and multiple inflight engine starts.
The Gray Wolf may be used in a networked swarm, like the AFRL Golden Horde initiative to be demonstrated in late 2020 with a modified Small Diameter Bomb I and a modified Miniature Air-Launched Decoy, coordinated against a simulated target in a fall 2021 demonstration.

Products
 AN/SEQ-3 Laser Weapon System
 Kratos XQ-58 Valkyrie
 Composite Engineering BQM-167 Skeeter
 "Demogorgon" or Off-Board Sensing Station drone (OBSS program)

Development contract
The US Army awarded Kratos a $29m contract in 2016 to support its directed-energy weapon systems. The company will commit to developing prototype technologies, components and subsystems to support the advancement and upgrade of the existing or new DE systems, according to army-technology.com. The prototype technologies to be developed include beam control, high energy lasers, adaptive optics, sensors, fire support and target tracking.  Work is expected to be carried out at several Kratos facilities and government locations in Huntsville, Alabama.

See also
 Titan Corporation

References

External links

Aerospace companies of the United States
Companies based in California
Companies based in San Diego
Companies listed on the Nasdaq
Defense companies of the United States